K M Ali Azam is the senior secretary of Ministry of Public Administration. He is the former secretary of Ministry of Industries and a director of British American Tobacco Bangladesh.

Early life 
Azam was born in 1953 in Udaipur village, Mollahat Upazila, Bagerhat District, East Pakistan, Pakistan. He completed his master's degree in economics from the University of Rajshahi.

Career 
Azam joined Bangladesh Civil Service on 20 December 1989 as part of the administration cadre.

Azam had served as the assistant commissioner in the Office of the Deputy Commissioner of Chittagong District. He was the assistant commissioner of Land in Meherpur Sadar Upazila. He was the upazila nirbahi officer of Satkhira Sadar Upazila in 2004. He was the district commissioner of Chapai Nawabganj District in 2010. He served as the deputy secretary in the Ministry of Public Administration and the joint secretary in the Ministry of Home Affairs. He was the director general of the Prime Minister's Office under Prime Minister Sheikh Hasina and project director of a2i Programme.

Azam has also served as the divisional commissioner of Dhaka Division. He served as the returning officer for the 11th Jatiya Sangsad in the Dhaka City Corporation area in 2018. In 2020, Azam was the secretary at the Ministry of Labour and Employment.

Azam was appointed the secretary in the Ministry of Industries on 27 May 2020 replacing Md Abdul Halim. On 21 June 2020, Azam was appointed a non-executive director of British American Tobacco Bangladesh. On 23 March 2021, Azam was the special guest in the United Nations Capital Development Fund's program titled “Leaving No Micro Merchants Behind in the Digital Era in Bangladesh”.

On 10 May 2021, Azam was appointed the senior secretary of the Ministry of Public Administration. He is a syndicate member of Khulna University of Engineering and Technology. He is a director of the Bangladesh Public Administration Training Centre.

References 

Living people
1953 births
People from Bagerhat District
Bangladeshi civil servants
Bangladeshi economists
University of Rajshahi alumni